Casalbeltrame (Casabaltram in Piedmontese and Lombard) is an Italian town of 962 inhabitants in the province of Novara in Piedmont.

A part of the municipal territory is included in the Natural Park of the Lame del Sesia.

The rice paddies of Casalbeltrame are known for the production of riso venere, an unusual black rice of Chinese origins. Venere refers to Venus, the goddess of love, and to the aphrodisiac properties claimed for the rice. The variety is included in the Slow Food Atlas.
 
Casalbeltrame borders the following municipalities: Biandrate, Casalino, Casalvolone, and San Nazzaro Sesia.

Monuments and places of interest

Religious architecture 
 Parish Church of Santa Maria Assunta. The current building is in the form of the eighteenth and nineteenth centuries, but it is certainly very old as evidenced, among other things, the bell tower and the Romanesque walls and frescoes found in the current attics (scenes of the Life of Christ, XV century) [2]. Attached to the church is the scurolo of the patron saint San Novello.
 Church and complex of Sant'Apollinare

Civil architectures 
 Villa Bracorens Savoiroux (18th century), seat of Materima, citadel of sculpture.

Military architectures 
 Castle (unusable since 2015)

Museums 
 "L çivel" Ethnographic Historical Museum of Agricultural Machinery
 Gipsoteca - plaster statues

Nature 
 Casalbeltrame swamp nature reserve

Society

Demographic evolution 
Inhabitants registered

Infrastructures and transport 
Between 1884 and 1933 the locality was served by a tram stop Vercelli-Biandrate-Fara.

Festivity 
 In June, the Beer Festival is held in collaboration between Proloco and Ghunter Stübe, Bavarian specialties and entertainment.
 For the occasion of the patronal feast, held on the last Sunday of August, there are 4 days in honor of the saint dedicated to his celebration

References

Cities and towns in Piedmont